Leonardo Scarselli (born 29 April 1975 in Florence) is an Italian professional road bicycle racer for UCI Professional Continental cycling team .

Palmares 

 Tour du Sénégal - Overall (2003)
 2 stages (2002)

External links

Italian male cyclists
1975 births
Living people
Cyclists from Florence